Vermont Route 207 (VT 207) is a  north–south state highway in Franklin County, Vermont, United States. North of VT 78, the route is town-maintained and internally designated as major collector 297.

Route description
Route 207 begins at an intersection with U.S. Route 7 north of St. Albans. It starts its journey north by immediately interchanging with Interstate 89 at Exit 20. It continues to roughly parallel the Interstate before turning northeast and crossing into the town of Highgate, where it meets and briefly overlaps with Route 78. Route 207 continues north out of Highgate into the extreme northern reaches of the state. Route 235 continues north into Quebec, where it becomes Quebec Route 235.

Major intersections

References

External links

207
Transportation in Franklin County, Vermont